Sophia Kleinherne (born 12 April 2000) is a German footballer who plays as a defender for Eintracht Frankfurt and the Germany national team.

Club career
In January 2020, Kleinherne was named by UEFA as one of the ten most promising young players in Europe.

In December 2021, Kleinherne extended her contract with Eintracht Frankfurt through June 2024.

International career
Kleinherne made her international debut for Germany on 9 November 2019 in a friendly match against England, which finished as a 2–1 win.

Career statistics

Scores and results list Germany's goal tally first, score column indicates score after each Kleinherne goal.

Honours 
Germany

 UEFA Women's Championship runner-up: 2022

Notes

References

External links
 
 
 
 

2000 births
Living people
People from Warendorf (district)
Sportspeople from Münster (region)
Footballers from North Rhine-Westphalia
German women's footballers
Women's association football defenders
Germany women's international footballers
Germany women's youth international footballers
UEFA Women's Euro 2022 players
Frauen-Bundesliga players
2. Frauen-Bundesliga players
FSV Gütersloh 2009 players
1. FFC Frankfurt players
Eintracht Frankfurt (women) players